Pigeye is an unincorporated community in Marion County, Alabama, United States.

References

Unincorporated communities in Marion County, Alabama
Unincorporated communities in Alabama